Khana Darreh-ye Olya (also Romanized as Khanā Darreh-ye ‘Olyā, Khenā Darreh ‘Olyā, and Khenā Darreh-ye ‘Olyā; also known as Khenā Darreh Bālā and Khenā Darreh-ye Bālā) is a village in Hendudur Rural District, Sarband District, Shazand County, Markazi Province, Iran. At the 2006 census, its population was 143, in 42 families.

References 

Populated places in Shazand County